Joyce L Pearce (1938-2011), was a female international fencer who competed for England.

Fencing career
She represented England and won a gold medal in the team foil, at the 1966 British Empire and Commonwealth Games in Kingston, Jamaica.

References

1932 births
2011 deaths
British female foil fencers
Commonwealth Games medallists in fencing
Commonwealth Games gold medallists for England
Fencers at the 1966 British Empire and Commonwealth Games
Medallists at the 1966 British Empire and Commonwealth Games